John William Crutcher (December 19, 1916 – March 13, 2017) was an American politician. Crutcher served in the Kansas State Senate from 1953 to 1957. He was the 35th Lieutenant Governor of Kansas from 1965 to 1969. Crutcher served as Commissioner of the Postal Rate Commission from 1982 to 1993, and as a member of the National Transportation Policy Study Commission. He was an alumnus of the University of Kansas (1940) and a veteran of the United States Navy and United States Naval Reserve.

Crutcher died at his home in Jefferson, North Carolina in March 2017 at the age of 100.

References

 

1916 births
2017 deaths
People from Gray County, Kansas
People from Ashe County, North Carolina
University of Kansas alumni
Businesspeople from Kansas
Military personnel from Kansas
Lieutenant Governors of Kansas
Republican Party Kansas state senators
United States Postal Service people
American centenarians
20th-century American politicians
Men centenarians
North Carolina Republicans
United States Navy personnel of World War II
United States Navy reservists
20th-century American businesspeople